|-
|Džajići
|Konjic
|Herzegovina-Neretva Canton
|-
|Džanići
|Konjic
|Herzegovina-Neretva Canton
|-
|Džepi
|Konjic
|Herzegovina-Neretva Canton
|-
|Džindići
|Goražde
|Bosnian Podrinje Canton
|-
|Džuha
|Goražde
|Bosnian Podrinje Canton
|}

Lists of settlements in the Federation of Bosnia and Herzegovina (A-Ž)